Pistacia terebinthus also called the terebinth  and the turpentine tree, is a deciduous tree species of the genus Pistacia, native to the Mediterranean region from the western regions of Morocco and Portugal to Greece and western and southeastern Turkey. At one time terebinths growing on the eastern shores of the Mediterranean Sea (in Syria, Lebanon and Israel) were regarded as a separate species, Pistacia palaestina, but these are now considered to be a synonym of P. terebinthus.

Description
The flowers are reddish-purple, appearing with the new leaves in early spring. All parts of the plant have a strong resinous smell.

The terebinth is a dioecious tree, i.e. it exists as male and female specimens. For a viable population both sexes must be present. Leaves alternate, leathery and compound paripinnate (no terminal leaflet) with three or six deep green leaflets. They are generally larger and rounder than the leaves of the mastic, reminiscent of the leaves of carob tree. The flowers range from purple to green, the fruit is the size of a pea and turns from red to brown, depending on the degree of maturation. The whole plant emits a strong smell: bitter, resinous, or medicinal. In the vegetative period they develop "galls" shaped like a goat's horn (from which the plant gets the name "cornicabra", the common name in Spanish), that occur on the leaves and leaflets which have been bitten by insects. The species propagates by seeds and shoots. Although marred by the presence of galls, it is a very strong and resistant tree which survives in degraded areas where other species have been eliminated. Pistacia terebinthus is related to Pistacia lentiscus, with which it hybridizes frequently in contact zones. Pistacia terebinthus is more abundant in the mountains and inland and the mastic is usually found more frequently in areas where the Mediterranean influence of the sea moderates the climate. The mastic tree does not reach the size of the Pistacia terebinthus, but the hybrids are very difficult to distinguish. The mastic has winged stalks to its leaflets, i.e., the stalks are flattened and with side fins, whereas these stems in Pistacia terebinthus are simple. On the west coast of the Mediterranean, Canary Islands and Middle East, P. terebinthus can be confused with P. atlantica.

Habitat

 
Supports Mediterranean summer drought and frost more intense than mastic. The plant is common in the garrigue and maquis. It appears in deciduous oak wood. It has a gray trunk that is very aromatic, and may have multiple trunks or stems when grown as a shrub. Usually reaching  in height, although in rare cases can reach . P. terebinthus is one of the European species of Anacardiaceae, a family of about 600 mostly tropical species. P. terebinthus is more moisture demanding than the mastic and more resistant to cold. It requires a sunny exposure and average soils, tolerating lime and some salt, often grows near the sea, deep ravines and near salt-lakes and streams.

History
Historian of Mycenae John Chadwick believes that the terebinth is the plant called ki-ta-no in some of the Linear B tablets. He cites the work of a Spanish scholar, J.L. Melena, who had found "an ancient lexicon which showed that kritanos was another name for the turpentine tree, and that the Mycenaean spelling could represent a variant form of this word."

The Latin name is underlain by the Ancient Greek name τερέβινθος which, in turn, is underlain by a pre-Greek Pelasgian word, marked by the characteristic consonant complex νθ.

Terebinth from Oricum is referred to in Virgil's Aeneid, Book 10, line 136, where Ascanius in battle is compared to "ivory skilfully inlaid in [...] Orician terebinth" ("inclusum[...] Oricia terebintho [...] ebur").

Terebinth is referred to by Robin Lane Fox in Alexander the Great: "When a Persian king took the throne, he attended Pasargadae, site of King Cyrus's tomb, and dressed in a rough leather uniform to eat a ritual meal of figs, sour milk and leaves of terebinth."

The terebinth is mentioned in the Hebrew Scriptures (or Old Testament), where the Hebrew word  (plural ) is used, although the word is sometimes translated as 'oak'. It is clear that the translators are uncertain which translation is correct, [...], yet the two are very different trees to any but the most superficial observation. (The Hebrew word  means 'oak', and the words may be related.) 

The word terebinth is found in three successive chapters of Genesis (12:6, 13:18, 14:13, 18:1) in reference to the places where Abram (later Abraham) camped called "Terebinths of Mam're the Amorite". Here, the traditional rendering in English is "oaks of Mamre."

It is also found in Genesis chapter 35, where Jacob commands his family to remove idols that were taken as booty from the battle in Shechem before travelling to Bethel.

The best known clear reference to a terebinth in the Hebrew Scriptures is that of the Valley of Elah or 'Valley of the Terebinth', where David fought Goliath.

Later in 2 Samuel 18:9 David's rebellious son Absalom is caught in the terebinth tree and is killed by Joab's men, David's army.

At least a few references occur in Judges: chapter 4 (in reference to Heber, the Kenite, of the children of Hobab), chapter 6 (in reference to an angel of the Lord who came to visit Gideon—most versions use 'oak'), and Ch 9 (in reference to the crowning of Abimelech, by the terebinth of the pillar that was in Shechem—again most versions use 'oak'). This reference of Abimelech's crowning by an oak is actually referring to the Palestine oak, closely related to the Kermes oak (Quercus coccifera). The Hebrew distinguishes the Palestine oak and the terebinth. It is also mentioned in Hosea 4:13 when Hosea is talking about Israel's spiritual adultery by sacrificing to false gods and how to repent and be forgiven in Hosea 14.

Uses
The word "Turpentine" was originally used for the exudate of terebinth trees (P. terebinthus and related species such as P. atlantica), now called Chian, Chios, or Cyprian turpentine, and it was later transferred to the crude turpentine (oleoresin) and the oil of turpentine (essential oil) of conifer trees. The word turpentine derives (via Old French and Latin) from the Greek word τερεβινθίνη (terebinthínē), the feminine form (to go with the feminine Greek word for resin) of an adjective τερεβίνθινος (terebínthinos), derived from the Greek noun τερέβινθος (terébinthos), the name for the terebinth tree. However, the main source of the terebinth turpentine is P. atlantica which produces abundant resin instead of P. terebinthus of which the amount of resin is limited.

The fruits are used in Cyprus for baking of a specialty village bread. In Crete, where the plant is called tsikoudia, it is used to flavor the local variety of pomace brandy, also called tsikoudia. In the Northern Sporades the shoots are used as a vegetable (called tsitsíravla). The plant is rich in tannins and resinous substances and was used for its aromatic and medicinal properties in classical Greece. A mild sweet scented gum can be produced from the bark, and galls often found on the plant are used for tanning leather. A triterpene has been extracted from these galls. In Turkey, it is known as menengiç or bıttım. A coffee-like beverage, Kurdish coffee or menengiç kahvesi, is made from the roasted fruit, and a soap is made from the oil. Terebinth resin was used as a wine preservative in the entire ancient Near East, as proven by many findings in areas such as the foot of the Zagros Mountains and Middle Bronze Age Galilee.

Gallery

See also
 Pistacia lentiscus
 Mastic (plant resin)
 Balm of Gilead

References

External links

 
 Flora Europaea: Pistacia terebinthus
 The Jewish Encyclopedia: Oak and Terebinth
 Kypros.org

terebinthus
Flora of Europe
Flora of Western Asia
Flora of North Africa
Plants described in 1753
Flora of the Mediterranean Basin